San Cristóbal Verapaz is a town, with a population of 20,961 (2018 census), and a municipality in the Guatemalan department of Alta Verapaz. It is located approximately 29 km from Cobán, the capital of Alta Verapaz and about 210 km from Guatemala City. San Cristóbal belongs to the Pokimchi' linguistic area.  Its main income source is the «Cobán» shoe factory, which specializes in industrial rubber boots, which are sold both locally and internationally.

History

Franja Transversal del Norte

The Northern Transversal Strip was officially created during the government of General Carlos Arana Osorio in 1970, by Legislative Decree 60-70, for agricultural development. The decree literally said: "It is of public interest and national emergency, the establishment of Agrarian Development Zones in the area included within the municipalities: San Ana Huista, San Antonio Huista, Nentón, Jacaltenango, San Mateo Ixtatán, and Santa Cruz Barillas in Huehuetenango; Chajul and San Miguel Uspantán in Quiché; Cobán, Chisec, San Pedro Carchá, Lanquín, Senahú, Cahabón and Chahal, in Alta Verapaz and the entire department of Izabal."

San Cristóbal Verapaz was not part of the Strip, but it was bordering it and felt the devastating effects of the Guatemala Civil War which was fought mainly in the Strip during the 1980s.

Religious celebrations and town fairs

Famous citizens

 Erick Barrondo: Olympic silver medalist in London 2012
 Rodolfo Narciso Chavarría:  music composer

Climate

San Cristóbal Verapaz has temperate climate (Köppen: Cfb).

Geographic location

Municipal distribution 

The rural area of the municipality has eighty nine communities, while the villa has five neighborhoods: Santa Ana, San Felipe, San Cristóbal, San Sebastián y Esquipulas. The municipality is divided into the following microregions:

 One villa
 Six large settlements
 Fifty seven small settlements
 Sixteen common land areas
 Five neighborhoods 
 Four cantones
 Three residential areas

There are eighteen populated locations that are considered the most important due to the number of inhabitants and utility availability and access:

Source:

Borders

See also
Lake Chichoj

Notes and references

Bibliography

Further reading

External links

 San Cristóbal Verapaz online
 San Cristóbal Verapaz in Info Cobán (in Spanish)
 Viaje a Guatemala: San Cristóbal Verapaz (in Spanish)

Municipalities of the Alta Verapaz Department